André Miquel (26 September 1929 – 27 December 2022) was a French Arabist and historian, specialist of Arabic literature and Arabic language.

Biography 
André Miquel was born in Mèze, Hérault on 26 September 1929. He studied literature. A student of the École normale supérieure which he joined in 1950, agrégé de grammaire and docteur ès lettres, from 1976 to 1997, he was holder of the Chair of classical Arabic language and literature at the Collège de France, of which he was general administrator from 1991 to 1997, after being that of the Bibliothèque nationale from 1984 to 1987.

Miquel was known for his work on the geography of the Arab World and the One Thousand and One Nights. His interest in the Arab world dates back to a trip to the Maghreb he won after winning the concours général of geography in 1946, and his discovery of the Quran in the translation by Claude-Étienne Savary.

This translation includes all 1205 poems based on the edition of Bulaq, named after the Egyptian city where the text was printed for the first time in 1835.

Miquel died in Paris on 27 December 2022, at the age of 93.

Honours and awards

Honours
 Grand Officier of the Legion of Honour.
 Officier of the National Order of Merit.
 Officier of the Palmes académiques.
 Commander of the Ordre des Arts et des Lettres.

Awards
 1969 : Marie-Eugène/Simon-Henri-Martin Award of the Académie Française (France). 
 2010 : King Abdullah bin Abdulaziz International Award for Translation (KSA).
 2010 : Golden Award at Doha Arab Cultural Capital Festival (Qatar).
 2019 : Mohammed bin Rashid Arabic Language Award (UAE).

Acknowledgement
 Member of the Academia Europaea.
 Member of the Heidelberg Academy of Sciences and Humanities.
 Honorary member of the Arab Academy of Damascus.
 Honorary member of the Tunisian foundation for translation, the establishment of texts and studies.

Selected publications

Principal works 
1968: L’Islam et sa civilisation (VIIe-XXe siècle)éd. Armand Colin, coll. "Destins du monde", Paris, work distinguished by the Académie française.
1971: Le fils interrompu
1973: La géographie humaine du monde musulman jusqu'au milieu du 11 siècle, vol. 1: Géographie et géographie humaine dans la littérature arabe des origines à 1050.
1975: La géographie humaine du monde musulman jusqu'au milieu du 11e siècle, vol.2: Géographie arabe et représentation du monde : la terre et l'étranger. 
1977: Langue et littérature arabes classiques, éd. Collège de France.
1978: Vive la suranie, éditions Flammarion.
1980: La géographie humaine du monde musulman jusqu'au milieu du 11e siècle, vol.3: Le milieu naturel.
1981: La Littérature arabe, Presses universitaires de France, "Que sais-je ?".
1988: La géographie humaine du monde musulman jusqu'au milieu du 11e siècle, vol.4: Les travaux et les jours, Éditions de l'EHESS, coll. "Civilisations et sociétés".
1992: L'Evénement : le Coran, sourate LVI, éd. Odile Jacob.
1992: D'Arabie et d'Islam,  éd. Odile Jacob, with  
1994: Du Golfe aux océans. L'Islam, éd. Hermann, Paris.
1995: Les Arabes : du message à l'histoire, éd.
1996: Deux Histoires d'amour : De Majnûn à Tristan, éd. Odile Jacob. 
2007: Le vieil homme et le vent, Pézenas, éd. Domens.
2010: Croire ou rêver, éd. Bayard.
2016: Le temps se signe à quelques repères: Mémoire, éd. Odile Jacob.

Translations 
1957: Ibn al-Muqaffa' (ʿAbd Allāh ibn al-Muqaffaʿ), Le livre de Kalila et Dimna, Paris, Klincksieck.
2005: Les Mille et une Nuits, Éditions Gallimard, "Bibliothèque de la Pléiade", translated with Jamel Eddine Bencheikh.

References

External links 
 André Miquel's bibliography on Univ-Provence
 André Miquel on France Culture
 André Miquel : Connaître son héritage arabe n'empêche pas d'être français on Le Point

1929 births
2022 deaths
People from Hérault
20th-century French historians
21st-century French historians
Scholars of medieval Islamic history
French Arabists
Arabic–French translators
École Normale Supérieure alumni
Academic staff of the Collège de France
Grand Officiers of the Légion d'honneur
Officers of the Ordre national du Mérite
Commandeurs of the Ordre des Arts et des Lettres
Officiers of the Ordre des Palmes Académiques
Members of Academia Europaea